La cosa buffa is a 1972 Italian film directed by Aldo Lado.

Plot
A young elementary school teacher falls in love with a Venetian woman who is the daughter of a wealthy industrialist.

References

External links

1972 films
1970s Italian-language films
Films directed by Aldo Lado
Films scored by Ennio Morricone
1970s Italian films